Fernando Augusto Azevedo Pedreira (born 14 November 1986), commonly known as Fernando, is a Brazilian-born Hong Kong professional footballer who currently plays for Hong Kong Premier League club Kitchee.

Club career
In June 2015, Fernando joined Kitchee. He was named Hong Kong's Footballer of the Year award for 2017.

On 1 July 2020, Eastern announced the signing of Fernando. He left the club on 9 July 2022.

On 25 July 2022, Fernando returned to Kitchee.

International career
On 21 February 2021, Fernando officially announced that he had received a Hong Kong passport, making him eligible to represent Hong Kong internationally.

On 17 May 2021, Fernando received his first call-up to the Hong Kong national football team to play against Iran, Iraq and Bahrain for the 2022 World Cup qualifiers. However, he withdrew from the squad due to injury on 25 May 2021.

On 1 June 2022, Fernando made his international debut for Hong Kong in the friendly match against Malaysia.

Career statistics

Club

Notes

Honours

Club
Kitchee
Hong Kong Premier League: 2016–17, 2017–18, 2019–20
Hong Kong Senior Shield: 2016–17, 2018–19
Hong Kong FA Cup: 2016–17, 2017–18, 2018–19
Hong Kong Sapling Cup: 2017–18, 2019–20, 2020–21
Hong Kong League Cup: 2015–16

Eastern
 Hong Kong Sapling Cup: 2020–21

Individual
Hong Kong Footballer of the Year: 2017

References

External links 

1986 births
Living people
Brazilian footballers
Hong Kong footballers
Hong Kong international footballers
Brazilian emigrants to Hong Kong
Naturalized footballers of Hong Kong
Sportspeople from Salvador, Bahia
Yokohama FC Hong Kong players
Kitchee SC players
Eastern Sports Club footballers
Brazilian expatriate sportspeople in Hong Kong
Brazilian expatriates in Hong Kong
Brazilian expatriate footballers
Association football midfielders
Hong Kong League XI representative players